Ricos y Famosos (Rich and Famous) is an Argentine telenovela. Issued between January 1997 and December 1998 in two seasons of more than 175 chapters each. The first season was starring Natalia Oreiro, Diego Ramos, Oscar Ferreiro, Antonio Grimau and Jessica Schultz. The second season was starring Arnaldo André, Leonor Benedetto, Oscar Ferreiro, Millie Stegman and Jessica Schultz, being broadcast by Canal 9.

Plot 
It began as the love story between two boys who, by a bad move from his father, the two families were confronted and the love they felt was difficult to carry out without someone trying to separate them. As time went by, in the soap opera there were more bad characters than good ones. The only good ones seemed to be only Valeria (Natalia Oreiro) and Diego (Diego Ramos). And many times, there were chapters where evil was predominate over goodness. And in this soap opera, in addition, took advantage of the evil character of Carla (Carina Zampini), and moved it to her to continue doing of his own with Salerno (Oscar Ferreiro), Diego's father. It was the first time that a character moved from one soap opera to another in Argentina, without either of them having any relationship, and the outstanding performance of Liliana Custo.

Cast

Season 1 
 Natalia Oreiro as Valeria García Méndez de Salerno
 Diego Ramos as Diego Salerno Ortigoza
 Antonio Grimau as Alberto García Méndez
 Norberto Díaz as Darío Servente
 Jessica Schultz as Elena Flores
 Segundo Cernadas as Agustín García Méndez
 Carina Zampini as Carla Lucero
 Karina Buzeki as Sabrina Servente
 Bettina O'Conell as Trinidad "Trini" Etcheverry
 Oscar Ferreiro as Luciano Salerno
 Elizabeth Killian as Martha García Méndez
 Diego Olivera as Julián 
 Dolores Fonzi as Yoli
 Cecilia Maresca as Berta / Mercedes
 Graciela Pal as Olga
 Lorena Paola as Teresita
 Leonardo Calandra as Tico
 Hernán Echeverría as Pablo
 Juan Ignacio Machado as Rubén
 Celina Font as Mónica
 Raúl Florido as Fermín
 María Ángeles Medrano as Paula

Season 2 
 Arnaldo Andre as Gerardo Murúa
 Jessica Schultz as Elena Flores
 Oscar Ferreiro as Luciano Salerno
 Millie Stegman as Sandra Quiroga
 Leonor Benedetto as Raquel Falconi
 Betiana Blum as Emilia 
 Aldo Barbero as Maldonado
 Juan Ignacio Machado as Rubén
 Celina Font as Mónica
 Raúl Florido as Fermín
 Julieta Fazzari as Celina
 Salo Pasik as Gómez
 Héctor Da Rosa as Cardozo
 Alfonso De Grazia as Simón

Special Participations 
 Carolina Papaleo as Estella Izaguirre
 Catalina Artusi as Mili
 Isabel Macedo as Isabel 
 Gustavo Guillén as Rodrigo
 Juan Vitali as Julio Romero
 Paola Papini as Irene
 Paula Siero as Aixa 
 Federico Luppi
 Dorita Ferreyro
 Carlos Mena
 Carola Reyna
 China Zorrilla
 Raúl Lavié
 María Encarnación Gutiérrez
 Osvaldo Brandi
 Víctor Bruno
 Daniela Cardone
 Hugo Cosiansi
 Judith Gabbani  
 Nacho Gadano
 Osvaldo Sabatini
 Denise Dumas
 Humberto Serrano
 Viviana Sáez
 Víctor Hugo Vieyra
 Daniel Alhadeff
 Silvina Rada
 Daniel Cano

External links
 

Argentine telenovelas
Spanish-language telenovelas
1997 telenovelas
1997 Argentine television series debuts
1998 Argentine television series endings
El Nueve original programming